Jarebice may refer to:

 Jarebice (Loznica), a village in Serbia
 Jarebice (Tutin), a village in Serbia